Leander Knight (born February 16, 1963) is a former American football defensive back. He played for the Atlanta Falcons from 1987 to 1988, the New York Jets in 1989 and for the Houston Oilers in 1990.

References

1963 births
Living people
American football defensive backs
Ferrum Panthers football players
Montclair State Red Hawks football players
Atlanta Falcons players
New York Jets players
Houston Oilers players
Players of American football from Newark, New Jersey
National Football League replacement players
East Orange High School alumni